William Kamuren Chirchir Chepkut (died 8 October 2022) was a Kenyan politician who served as member of the National Assembly for the Ainabkoi Constituency between 2017 and 2022. He lost his seat to Samuel Chepkonga in the 2022 Kenyan general election.

Early years and education 
Between 1992 and 1995 he studied at Jabalpur University in India to study Bachelor of Commerce. He furthered his education at Kenyatta University  where  he acquired master's of Arts in Community Development and Organization. He was a member of the Special Funds Account Committee and the Committee on Appointments in the parliament.

Personal life and death 
On the morning of 8 October 2022, Chepkut collapsed at his house and was rushed to Mediheal Hospital in Nairobi, where he was pronounced dead.

Election results

References

Year of birth missing
20th-century births
2022 deaths
21st-century Kenyan politicians
Independent politicians in Kenya
Members of the 12th Parliament of Kenya
People from Uasin Gishu County